The Richard-Wagner-Straße is a street in the Bavarian state capital Munich. It is named after the composer Richard Wagner (1813-1883), who lived in the vicinity of Brienner Straße 37 in 1864-65.

Location 
The short street was built in 1897 in the course of the planned development of Maxvorstadt and forms part of the large right-angled street system of this district. It leads from Brienner Straße in the north-east direction to Gabelsbergerstraße. At about the half way point, it curves.

History 
The houses of the street were built between 1899 and 1906 mostly designed by the architect Leonhard Romeis (1854-1904). In his design, he cited various architectural periods, keeping in mind the taste of late historicism, to give the impression of a grown street. The rich structure of the houses, which is still largely preserved today, creates a particularly picturesque, self-contained area, which stands under monument protection as an ensemble. The eleven preserved historic buildings of this street are also listed as individual monuments under monument protection. More recently are the main administration of the E.ON energy group as well as an urban nursery (No. 14) and a student residence (No. 16).

The proximity to the Königsplatz made the street an address for the upscale bourgeoisie. Joseph Schülein (1854-1938), lived there until his move to Schloss Kaltenberg (No. 7). His son-in-law, the Jewish surgeon Alfred Haas, operated a private clinic (No. 17 and 19). The publisher Fritz Gerlich (1883-1934) lived until his imprisonment and assassination, in house No. 21.

During the period of National Socialism, the Nazi horse racing organization Kuratorium für das Braune Band von Deutschland located in house No. 7. In House No. 11 a so-called Judenhaus was established.
					
Several institutions have or have had their seat in the street, such as the former Royal College of Art, today the Palaeontological State Collection with the Palaeontological Museum (No. 10), and the Isar Amperwerke, today E.ON.

Buildings

References 

Maxvorstadt
Historicist architecture in Munich
Streets in Munich